This is a listing of the horses that finished in either first, second, or third place and the number of starters in the Wood Memorial Stakes, an American Grade 1 race for three-year-olds at 1-1/8 miles on dirt held at Aqueduct Racetrack in Jamaica, New York.  (List 1973-present)

References 

Triple Crown Prep Races
Aqueduct Racetrack
Horse races in New York City